Ald is an obsolete Mongolian measure equal to the length between a man's outstretched arms. An ald is therefore approximately equal to

See also
 Mongolian units

Mongolian culture
Units of length
Human-based units of measurement
Obsolete units of measurement